Locus Biosciences is a clinical-stage pharmaceutical company, founded in 2015 and based in Research Triangle Park, North Carolina. Locus develops phage therapies based on CRISPR–Cas3 gene editing technology, as opposed to the more commonly used CRISPR-Cas9, delivered by engineered bacteriophages. The intended therapeutic targets are antibiotic-resistant bacterial infections.

History 
The company was founded as a spin-off from North Carolina State University (NCSU) in 2015 with licensed CRISPR patents from the university. The company started with a $5 million convertible note from Tencent Holdings and North Carolina Biotechnology Center.

In 2017, the company closed a $19 million Series A led by Artis Ventures, Tencent Holdings Ltd, and Abstract Ventures. In 2020, the company sold convertible notes in a debt raise to roll into its next equity round in 2021.

In 2018, Locus acquired a high-throughput bacteriophage discovery platform from San Francisco-based phage therapy company Epibiome, Inc.

In 2019, the company entered into a strategic collaboration with Janssen Pharmaceuticals (a Johnson & Johnson company) worth up to $818 million to develop CRISPR-Cas3 drugs targeting two bacterial pathogens. Locus received $20 million upfront and up to $798 million in milestones and royalties on net sales.

In 2020, the company signed a $12.5 million partnership with the global non-profit, Combating Antibiotic-Resistant Bacteria Biopharmaceutical Accelerator (CARB-X). In November 2020, Locus had 52 people and planned to expand to 85 by 2021; by the end of 2021, they had about 80 employees. As of January 2022, the company and all employees were contained in a single 25,000 square foot research and manufacturing facility.

CRISPR CAS3 

CRISPR-Cas3 is more destructive than the better known CRISPR–Cas9 used by companies like Caribou Biosciences, Editas Medicine, Synthego, Intellia Therapeutics, CRISPR Therapeutics and Beam Therapeutics. CRISPR–Cas3 destroys the targeted DNA in either prokaryotic or eukaryotic cells. Co-founder, Rodolphe Barrangou, said "Cas3 is a meaner system...but if you want to cut a tree and get rid of it, you bring a chain saw, not a scalpel".

CRISPR-Cas systems fall into two classes. Class 1 systems use a complex of multiple Cas proteins to degrade foreign nucleic acids. Class 2 systems use a single large Cas protein for the same purpose. Class 1 is divided into types I, III, and IV; class 2 is divided into types II, V, and VI. The 6 system types are divided into 19 subtypes. Many organisms contain multiple CRISPR-Cas systems suggesting that they are compatible and may share components.

Therapy development

The company enrolled its first patient in a Phase 1b clinical trial in January 2020. The trial intends to evaluate LBP-EC01, a CRISPR Cas3-enhanced bacteriophage against Escherichia coli bacteria which cause urinary tract infections. Twenty patients will get a phage cocktail, and 10 will get a placebo. The trial completed before March 2021 and a Phase II trial is expected to start within two years. The company has an agreement the US government's Biomedical Advanced Research and Development Authority which began in 2020 and provides funding to support Phase II and Phase III trials.

Publications 
As of 2022, there are no peer-reviewed publications that are solely or primarily authored by Locus Biosciences staff.

References

Pharmaceutical companies of the United States
Gene therapy
Health care companies based in North Carolina
Bacteriophages
2015 establishments in North Carolina
University spin-offs